This is the discography for American R&B singer Kenny Lattimore.

Albums

Studio albums

Collaborative albums

Compilation albums

Singles

Album appearances and collaborations

Discography References:

References

External links

 Official Kenny Lattimore site
 
 
 

Discographies of American artists